Colin Senior (3 June 1927 – 9 January 2011) was an English professional footballer who played as a defender for Huddersfield Town and Accrington Stanley in the Football League during the 1950s.

References

1927 births
2011 deaths
Accrington Stanley F.C. (1891) players
Association football defenders
Corby Town F.C. players
English Football League players
English footballers
Footballers from Dewsbury
Huddersfield Town A.F.C. players
Peterborough United F.C. players